This list of the prehistoric life of Rhode Island contains the various prehistoric life-forms whose fossilized remains have been reported from within the US state of Rhode Island.

Precambrian
The Paleobiology Database records no known occurrences of Precambrian fossils in Rhode Island.

Paleozoic
 †Adeloblatta
 †Adeloblatta gorhami – type locality for species
 †Anthracomartus
 †Anthracomartus woodruffi – type locality for species
 †Aphelomylacris – tentative report
 †Aphelomylacris modesta – type locality for species
 †Discoblatta
 †Discoblatta scholfieldi – type locality for species
 †Dysmenes
 †Dysmenes illustris – type locality for species
 †Etoblattina
 †Etoblattina exilis – type locality for species
 †Gyroblatta
 †Gyroblatta clarki – type locality for species
 †Gyroblatta scapularis – type locality for species
 †Heolus – type locality for genus
 †Heolus providentiae – type locality for species
 †Microblattina – type locality for genus
 †Microblattina perdita – type locality for species
 †Mylacris
 †Mylacris packardii – type locality for species
 †Paralogus – type locality for genus
 †Paralogus aeschnoides – type locality for species
 †Phyloblatta
 †Phyloblatta latebricola – type locality for species
 †Polycreagra – type locality for genus
 †Polycreagra elegans – type locality for species
 †Pseudetoblattina
 †Pseudetoblattina reliqua – type locality for species
 †Rhaphidiopsis – type locality for genus
 †Rhaphidiopsis diversipenna – type locality for species
 †Xenoblatta
 †Xenoblatta fraterna – type locality for species

Mesozoic

The Paleobiology Database records no known occurrences of Mesozoic fossils in Rhode Island.

Cenozoic

 †Anguinella
 †Anguinella virginica
  Barbatia
 †Barbatia marylandica – or unidentified comparable form
 Caryocorbula
 †Caryocorbula cuneata
 Cerithiopsis
 †Cerithiopsis calvertensis – or unidentified comparable form
 Cerithium
 †Chesapecten
  †Chesapecten jeffersonius – or unidentified comparable form
 Cliona
 Glossus
 †Glossus mazlea – or unidentified comparable form
 †Mariacolpus
 †Mariacolpus plebeia
 Nuculana
 †Nuculana liciata
 Stewartia
 †Stewartia anodonta – or unidentified comparable form
  Tellina

References
 

Rhode Island